Tsanko Nikolaev Tsvetanov (born 6 January 1970) is a Bulgarian former professional footballer who played as a left-back. After ending his playing career he began coaching.

Club career
Tsvetanov was born in Svishtov, Bulgaria. His professional career began in 1987 by playing one season for Akademik Svishtov. Soon he was noticed by Etar Veliko Tarnovo, a team that was a powerhouse in Bulgarian football at the time. He played five seasons and over 140 league matches for the Bolyars. In 1993, he was transferred to Levski Sofia, the champions of Bulgaria for the previous season. After leaving Levski he had a brief stay at Waldhof Mannheim. He signed for Aberdeen in the summer of 1996 and returned in Germany to play three seasons for FC Energie Cottbus. He ended his career at Etar Veliko Tarnovo.

International career
Tsvetanov made 40 appearances for the Bulgaria national team. He was part of the squad that reached the semi-finals of the 1994 World Cup, which remains the biggest success in the history of Bulgarian football. He also played at Euro 96, appearing in all three group stage matches.

Honours
Etar Veliko Tarnovo
 A Group: 1990–91

Levski Sofia
 A Group: 1993–94, 1994–95, 2001–02
 Bulgarian Cup: 1993–94, 2001–02

Bulgaria
 FIFA World Cup fourth place: 1994

References

External links
 
 
 Profile at LevskiSofia.info

Living people
1970 births
Sportspeople from Veliko Tarnovo Province
Association football defenders
Bulgarian footballers
Bulgaria international footballers
1994 FIFA World Cup players
UEFA Euro 1996 players
PFC Akademik Svishtov players
FC Etar Veliko Tarnovo players
PFC Levski Sofia players
SV Waldhof Mannheim players
Aberdeen F.C. players
FC Energie Cottbus players
FC Etar 1924 Veliko Tarnovo players
First Professional Football League (Bulgaria) players
Bundesliga players
Scottish Football League players
Bulgarian expatriate footballers
Bulgarian expatriate sportspeople in Germany
Expatriate footballers in Germany
Bulgarian expatriate sportspeople in Scotland
Expatriate footballers in Scotland